Karen Gustavo Rocha (born 4 March 1984, in São Paulo) is a Brazilian basketball player who competed in the 2008 Summer Olympics.

References

1984 births
Living people
Basketball players from São Paulo
Brazilian women's basketball players
Olympic basketball players of Brazil
Basketball players at the 2008 Summer Olympics